Eucalyptus brevistylis, commonly known as Rate's tingle, is a tree that is endemic to the south-west of Western Australia. It has fissured, fibrous to stringy bark, lance-shaped adult leaves, flower buds in groups of between nine and thirteen, white flowers and almost spherical fruit with a small opening.

Description
It has fissured, greyish to reddish brown, fibrous to stringy bark that tends to be papery on the outside. Flowering occurs between January and February or between April and November and the flowers are white.

Taxonomy and naming
Eucalyptus brevistylis was first described in 1974 by Ian Brooker from a specimen collected near Walpole by Bruce Maslin. The specific epithet (brevistylis) is derived from Latin brevis meaning "short" and -stylis meaning "having a style", referring to the short style in this species.

Distribution and habitat
Rate's tingle grows in wet forests near Walpole. It was previously confused with two other "tingle" species, the red tingle, E. jacksonii and the yellow tingle E. guilfoylei. The name "tingle" or "tingle tingle" is thought to be of Aboriginal origin. This tingle was not previously recognised as a separate species, despite the efforts of the forester Jack Rate.

Rate's tingle and red tingle, Eucalyptus jacksonii, are closely related and both can live for up to 400 years.

Conservation
Eucalyptus brevistylis is classified as "Priority Four" by the Government of Western Australia Department of Parks and Wildlife, meaning that is rare or near threatened.

See also
List of Eucalyptus species

References

Eucalypts of Western Australia
Trees of Australia
brevistylis
Myrtales of Australia
Plants described in 1974
Taxa named by Ian Brooker
Endemic flora of Southwest Australia